
Year 495 (CDXCV) was a common year starting on Sunday (link will display the full calendar) of the Julian calendar. At the time, it was known as the Year of the Consulship of Viator without colleague (or, less frequently, year 1248 Ab urbe condita). The denomination 495 for this year has been used since the early medieval period, when the Anno Domini calendar era became the prevalent method in Europe for naming years.

Events 
 By place 
 Britannia 
 Cerdic of Wessex and his son, Cynric, land somewhere on the south coast, probably near the Hampshire-Dorset border. Their followers establish the beginnings of the Kingdom of Wessex.

 China 
 Emperor Xiao Wen Di of Northern Wei builds the Shaolin Monastery (Henan) for the monk Batuo (for alternate founding date see 477 or 497).

 By topic 
 Religion 
 Pope Gelasius I gains support from Italian bishops, in his assertion that the spiritual power of the papacy is superior to the emperor's temporal authority. Like his predecessors, the pope opposes the Byzantine emperor Anastasius I's efforts to establish Miaphysite doctrine.

Births 
 Queen Amalasuntha of the Ostrogoths (approximate date)
 King Chlodomer of the Franks (d. 524)
 Finnian of Moville, Irish bishop (d. 589)
 Guntheuc, princess of Burgundy (d. c. 532)
 Husi Chun, general of Northern Wei (d. 537)
 King Theudebert I of Austrasia (approximate date)

Deaths 
 Fráech mac Finchada, king of Leinster

References